Justice is the third studio album by American rock band Rev Theory, released on February 15, 2011, by Interscope Records. The first single, also titled "Justice", was released to iTunes and radio on October 25, 2010. Justice peaked at number 5 on the US Billboard Hard Rock Albums chart and number 75 on the Billboard 200. The album has sold 54,000 copies in the United States to date. The song "Justice" was used for WWE's Extreme Rules in 2011. The song "Hangman" was used for the secondary theme song for WWE's SmackDown from 2009 to 2012.

Track listing

Chart positions

Album

Singles

References

2011 albums
Rev Theory albums
Interscope Records albums
Albums produced by Terry Date